The Health Insurance Institute of Slovenia was founded on March 1, 1992, according to the Law on healthcare and health insurance, after declaring independence from Yugoslavia. The Institute is called: Institute for Medical Insurance (Zavod za zdravsteno zavarovanje). It conducts its business as a public institute, bound by statute to provide compulsory health insurance. The Institute's principal task is to provide effective collection (mobilisation) and distribution (allocation) of public funds, in order to ensure the insured persons quality rights arising from the said funds.

Health insurance is compulsory and voluntary. Compulsory health insurance is provided by the Health Insurance Institute of Slovenia, voluntary health insurance is carried out by other health insurance companies.

The Institute comprises 10 regional units and 45 branch offices distributed around the territory of Slovenia. The Information Centre and the Directorate complete the Institute's structure. At the end of 2019, the Institute staff numbered regular 950 employees.
The Institute is governed by an Assembly, whose members are the (elected) representatives of employers (including the representatives of the Government of the Republic of Slovenia) and employees. The executive body of the Assembly is the Institute Board of Directors.

The Slovene health insurance card system was introduced, at the national scale, in the year 1999. The system provides the insured persons with a smart card. The card carries the identification number (HIIS number), the card issue number, the name and surname of the card holder, gender, and date of birth. Data links are established between the health care service providers and health insurance providers (the Health Insurance Institute and the two voluntary health insurance providers). Medical records are accessed by a health care professional using a double card reader. The professional's card controls their level of access.

See also
 List of hospitals in Slovenia
 List of Slovenian physicians
 Ljubljana Central Pharmacy

References

Medical and health organizations based in Slovenia